Bakone Justice Moloto (born 26 July 1944) is a South African former lawyer, who served as a judge at the International Criminal Tribunal for the former Yugoslavia (ICTY) in The Hague.

Early life and education
Moloto gained a degree in law from the University of South Africa.

Career
For ten years until 2005, he was a judge at South Africa's Land Claims Court, hearing disputes arising from laws underpinning the country's land reform initiatives. Since 17 November 2005 he is a member of the ICTY and is currently one of three judges presiding over the trial of Ratko Mladić.

Moloto entered a Dissenting Opinion from the majority in their Judgement convicting General Momčilo Perišić at the ICTY on 6 September 2011.

He is a member of the Crimes Against Humanity Initiative Advisory Council, a project of the Whitney R. Harris World Law Institute at Washington University School of Law in St. Louis to establish the world’s first treaty on the prevention and punishment of crimes against humanity.

References

1944 births
Living people
20th-century South African judges
21st-century South African lawyers
International Criminal Tribunal for the former Yugoslavia judges
University of South Africa alumni
South African judges of United Nations courts and tribunals